Charming (富榮) is one of the 20 constituencies in the Yau Tsim Mong District.

The constituency returns one district councillor to the Yau Tsim Mong District Council, with an election every four years. The seat is currently held by Lee Wai-fung of the Democratic.

Provident constituency is loosely based on the Charming Garden and southwestern part of Mongkok with estimated population of 18,029.

Councillors represented

Election results

2010s

2000s

References

Yau Ma Tei
Tai Kok Tsui
Mong Kok
Constituencies of Hong Kong
Constituencies of Yau Tsim Mong District Council
1999 establishments in Hong Kong
Constituencies established in 1999